The 1911 Wisconsin Badgers football team represented the University of Wisconsin as a member of the Western Conference during the 1911 college football season. Led first-year head coach John R. Richards, the Badgers compiled an overall record of 5–1–1 with a mark of 2–1–1 in conference play, placing third in the Western Conference. The team's captain was Alfred L. Buser.

Schedule

References

Wisconsin
Wisconsin Badgers football seasons
Wisconsin Badgers football